Stanisław Sielański (8 August 1899 – 28 April 1955) was a Polish film and cabaret actor. He appeared in more than 50 films between 1929 and 1943.

Selected filmography

 Uwiedziona (1931)
 Bezimienni bohaterowie (1932)
 Zabawka (1933)
 Parade of the Reservists (1934)
 Love, Cherish, Respect (1934)
 Rapsodia Bałtyku (1935)
 Granny Had No Worries (1935)
 Kochaj tylko mnie (1935)
 Będzie lepiej (1936)
 Pan Twardowski (1936)
 Daddy Gets Married (1936)
 Wierna rzeka (1936)
 Kobiety nad przepaścią (1938)
 Rena (1938)
 Ostatnia brygada (1938)
 Serce matki (1938)
 Doctor Murek (1939)
 The Vagabonds (1939)

References

External links

1899 births
1955 deaths
Polish cabaret performers
Polish male film actors
Actors from Łódź
Polish emigrants to the United States
20th-century Polish male actors
20th-century comedians